The 1985 Segunda División de Chile was the 34th season of the Segunda División de Chile.

Trasandino was the tournament's champion.

Final table

North Zone

South Zone

Promotion Playoffs - North Zone

Relegation Playoffs - North Zone

Promotion Playoffs - South Zone

Relegation Playoffs - South Zone

See also
Chilean football league system

References

External links
 RSSSF - List of Second Division Champions

Segunda División de Chile (1952–1995) seasons
Primera B
1985 in South American football leagues